Wendy Williams (7 November 1934 – 17 October 2019) was a British actress.

She is best known for her work on television, with credits including: Danger Man, Z-Cars, The Regiment, The Pallisers, Thriller, Doctor Who (in the serial The Ark in Space), Survivors, Poldark, Beau Geste, Tenko and The Darling Buds of May. She had a long running role in Crossroads as Sally Banks, stepping in to the role at very short notice when the original actress Patricia Mort quit the series without notice.

She also played the part of Fay Kent in Feet of Clay.

Williams was married to television director Hugh David until his death in 1987.

References

External links
 

1934 births
2019 deaths
20th-century British actresses
British television actresses